Dəymədərə (also, Daymadere and Deymedere) is a village and municipality in the Oghuz Rayon of Azerbaijan.  It has a population of 501.

References 

Populated places in Oghuz District